Parliamentary elections were held in Portugal on 13 October 1878. The result was a victory for the Regeneration Party, which won 97  seats.

Results

The results exclude the seats from overseas territories.

References

Legislative elections in Portugal
1878 elections in Europe
1878 in Portugal
October 1878 events